was a Japanese samurai of the Sengoku period who served the Oda clan. First he served the Toki clan and Saito clan. When Oda Nobunaga started campaign on Mino Province, he became a vassal of Nobunaga as a member of "Kuro-horo-shu" (bodyguard unit in black)

Military life
In 1552, Hachiya clan took part in the Battle of Akatsuka as vanguard (possibly Yoritaka) against Yamaguchi clan.

In late 1568, Yoritaka joined Shibata Katsuie, Hosokawa Fujitaka, Mori Yoshinari and Sakai Masahisa in attacking Iwanari Tomomichi at Shōryūji Castle.

In 1576, he took part at Siege of Mitsuji, the battle was part of the eleven-year Ishiyama Hongan-ji War.

In the Siege of Itami (1579), Yoritaka also conducted the execution of the Araki Murashige family who rose in revolt against Nobunaga.

In 1582, he took part at the Battle of Yamazaki against Akechi Mitsuhide.

In 1583, at Battle of Shizugatake, Yoritaka served Hashiba Hideyoshi and participated in the attack on Gifu Castle of Oda Nobutaka. After the battle, he was given 40,000 koku in Tsuruga of Echizen Province.

In 1585, under Toyotomi Hideyoshi he fought in the Toyama Campaign against Sassa Narimasa.

In 1587, Yoritaka also joint attack at Hideyoshi's Kyushu campaign against Shimazu clan.

Death
He died in 1589, at the age of 56. Around that time, Naomasa, Yoritaka's adopted son who was the fourth son of Niwa Nagahide, seemed to be already dead, and so he had no heir and the Hachiya clan ended.

References 

Samurai
1534 births
1589 deaths
Oda retainers